The 2008–09 Michigan State Spartans women's basketball team represented Michigan State University in the 2008–09 NCAA Division I basketball season. The Spartans were coached by Suzy Merchant and played their home games at the Breslin Center.

Exhibition

Regular season
The season debut was a record breaking one as the Spartans defeated Niagara, 116-50. MSU set new program records in points scored, also a Breslin Center record, and margin of victory. The Spartans had six players on their roster to score in double-figures. This also tied a program record that was last accomplished on Nov. 24, 1990 against Georgetown. Redshirt junior Lauren Aitch led the way with a career-high 25 points in 21 minutes, shooting 10-of-11 from the field and 5-of-6 from the line. She also tied for the team-lead with eight rebounds. Freshman Courtney Schiffauer began her Spartan career by pouring in 21 points and tying Aitch for the team lead with eight rebounds. Schiffauer, whose 21 points was the most in a Spartan debut since Lindsay Bowen scored 26 back in 2002, was 9-of-12 from the field and sank both of her free throws.
Nov. 23, 2008: Michigan State won the 2008 TD Banknorth Classic title with an 81-48 win over Quinnipiac at Patrick Gymnasium on the campus of University of Vermont. Junior Allyssa DeHaan poured in a season-high 21 points, becoming the 19th player in MSU history to top the 1,000-point plateau. The Spartans begin 5-0 for only the fourth time in team history and for the first time since 1999-00. DeHaan, who was 8-of-11 from the field, scored the fourth 3-pointer of her career, and went 4-of-4 from the free throw line. She was the fifth fastest Spartan to 1,000 points, needing only 75 games.

Roster

Schedule

NCAA basketball tournament
Berkeley Regional
Michigan State 60, Middle Tennessee 59
Michigan State 63, Duke 49
Iowa State 69, Michigan State 68

References

External links
Official Site

Michigan State Spartans women's basketball seasons
Michigan State
Michigan State